President Yo La Tengo is the third album by American indie rock band Yo La Tengo, released in 1989 by record label Coyote.

Recording 

President Yo La Tengo was recorded at Waterhouse studio, except for tracks 4 and 6, recorded at CBGB.

Content 

The album contains two new versions of instrumental vehicle "The Evil That Men Do" (previously featured on the 1986 album Ride the Tiger), including an extensive live performance. "Orange Song" is a cover of the Antietam song.

Release 

The CD version (released by Coyote/Twin Tone Records) included the band's previous album New Wave Hot Dogs and the A-side of the 1987 single "The Asparagus Song". It was re-released by Matador Records, in 1996.

Reception 

Stereogum wrote: "Featuring a number of great early Yo La Tengo compositions, President Yo La Tengo is an initiation into the creative ethic of a good band that is going to turn great".

Track listing

Personnel
Ira Kaplan – guitars, lead vocals, organ
Georgia Hubley – drums, harmony vocals; bass solo (track 1)
Gene Holder – bass (tracks 1–3, 5), guitar flourishes (track 3)
Stephan Wichnewski – bass (tracks 4, 6, 7)
John Baumgartner – accordion (track 7)

References

External links 

 

Yo La Tengo albums
1989 EPs